Al-Ahd (lit. "the contract" or "the covenant" in Arabic) may refer to:
 Al-Ahd (Iraq) or the Covenant Society, a political group 1913–1921
 Al-Ahd (Morocco) or the Covenant Party, a political party 2002–2008